The Sri Lanka national cricket team toured Zimbabwe in November and December 1999 to play 3 Test matches and 5 ODIs.

Squads

Tour matches

Zimbabwe Cricket Union President's XI v Sri Lankans

Zimbabwe Cricket Academy v Sri Lankans

Test series

1st Test

2nd Test

3rd Test

ODI series

1st ODI

2nd ODI

3rd ODI

4th ODI

5th ODI

References

External links
  Sri Lanka in Zimbabwe 1999/00, CricketArchive 
 Sri Lanka tour of Zimbabwe 1999/00, Cricinfo

1999 in Sri Lankan cricket
1999 in Zimbabwean cricket
International cricket competitions from 1997–98 to 2000
1999-2000
Zimbabwean cricket seasons from 1980–81 to 1999–2000